The Minister of State at the Department of Further and Higher Education, Research, Innovation and Science is a junior ministerial post in the Department of Further and Higher Education, Research, Innovation and Science of the Government of Ireland who performs duties and functions delegated by the Minister for Further and Higher Education, Research, Innovation and Science. A Minister of State does not hold cabinet rank.

The current Minister of State is Niall Collins, TD, who was appointed in July 2020.

List of Ministers of State

References

Further and Higher Education, Research, Innovation and Science
Department of Further and Higher Education, Research, Innovation and Science